'HMS Anchusa (later renamed Silverlord and  Sir Edgar') was a  that served in the Royal Navy.

She was launched in 1941 under the crash wartime construction program instituted by the Royal Navy shortly before the Fall of France. Built by Harland and Wolff in Belfast (one of only 34 Flower-class ships to be built in Northern Ireland), she incorporated a number of improvements to earlier Flower-class ships, that improved her performance in escorting convoys.

She had a relatively small crew of 96, with a displacement of nearly 1,000 tons, but she was mounted with the Hedgehog anti-submarine mortar, which launched contact-detonating depth charges at an enemy submarine far away from the boat itself.

Her surface armament consisted of one 102 mm gun, and six 20 mm cannon on single mounts. Her underwater armament consisted of the aforementioned Hedgehog and seventy depth charges. She was instrumental in damaging German U-boat activities in the channel area and the Atlantic, and was used as a mercantile ship after the war, being renamed Silverlord in 1949.

She was renamed once more as Sir Edgar in 1954, but was lost on 18 January 1960. She was salvaged but subsequently scrapped in Mauritius.

References

 The World War II Warships Guide'', Robert Hewson; (2000), 
 HMS Anchusa on the Arnold Hague database at convoyweb.org.uk.
 HMS Anchusa at www.oldships.org.uk

 

Ships built in Belfast
Flower-class corvettes of the Royal Navy
1941 ships
Ships built by Harland and Wolff
Steamships of the United Kingdom
Merchant ships of the United Kingdom
Maritime incidents in 1960